Judson "Jud" Gilbert II (born January 22, 1952) was a member of the Michigan Legislature. Immediately prior to this term (2010-2012) he was a member of the Michigan State Senate, where he has served since 2002. Prior to that he was a member of the Michigan House of Representatives from 1998 to 2002. Gilbert is a Roman Catholic.  In 2010 Gilbert was elected to a third term in the Michigan State House.

Gilbert's House district covered most of St. Clair County.  His former Senate District covered all of St. Clair County and Lapeer County  He is a native of Algonac.  He graduated from Algonac High School and St. Clair County Community College.  He later went to Wayne State University, where he studied mortuary science.  He then spent several years as a funeral home director.

Gilbert is term limited and thus not running for re-election in 2010.  However, since the term limit in the state house is 3 terms and he only served two, Gilbert is running for the State House District 81.

While in the State Senate Gilbert was an early fighter for replacing the Single Business Tax and was endorsed by the state chamber of commerce for these actions.  Gilbert is the chair of the Senate Transportation Committee and as such has been involved in negotiations to build the Detroit River International Crossing.  He has stalled this project to some extent with his inquiries about particulars of the project, such as who will pay the owners of the land condemned to build the bridge crossings and what will happen if toll revenue is below projections.

References

Sources
Vote Smart bio
Gilbert's official web page
Michigan Votes profile for Gilbert
Aug. 4, 2010 Times Herald article on Gilbert

1952 births
Living people
People from Algonac, Michigan
Wayne State University alumni
American funeral directors
Republican Party members of the Michigan House of Representatives
Republican Party Michigan state senators
20th-century American politicians
21st-century American politicians